Milecastle 15 (Whitchester) was a milecastle of the Roman Hadrian's Wall. It has not been excavated.

Construction 
Milecastle 15 was a long-axis milecastle of unknown gateway type.  Long-axis milecastles were thought to have been constructed by either the Legio VI Victrix who were based in Eboracum (York) or the Legio XX Valeria Victrix who were based in Deva Victrix (Chester).

Excavations and investigations
1958 – The milecastle is identified from an RAF aerial photo.
1966 – English Heritage Field Investigation.  It was noted that the milecastle was a long-axis type.
1989 – English Heritage Field Investigation.

Associated turrets 
Each milecastle on Hadrian's Wall had two associated turret structures.  These turrets were positioned approximately one-third and two-thirds of a Roman mile to the west of the Milecastle, and would probably have been manned by part of the milecastle's garrison.  The turrets associated with Milecastle 15 are known as Turret 15A and Turret 15B.

Turret 15A
Turret 15A was located in the expected position in 1931.  Only one course remained.  An English Heritage Field Investigation in 1966 noted that the Turret was covered by the modern road.

Location on Ordnance Survey 1:25 000 map:

Turret 15B
Turret 15B was thought to have been located in 1931, in the expected position.  The 1931 investigation reported little more than footing.  An English Heritage Field Investigation in 1966 noted that the Turret was covered by the modern road, and a further English Heritage Field Investigation in 1989 cast doubt on whether the footings reported in 1931 were sufficient evidence for the existence of the turret at this location.

Location on Ordnance Survey 1:25 000 map:

Monument records

References

Bibliography

External links

15